Singham is a 2011 Indian Hindi-language action film in the Cop Universe.

Singham may also refer to:

Film
Cop Universe, a series of Hindi films directed by Rohit Shetty and starring Ajay Devgn and Ranveer Singh
 Little Singham, a 2018 animated television series based on the 2011 film Singham
 Singham, a 2014 film
 Simmba, a 2018 film
 Singham Returns, an Indian Punjabi-language action comedy film

Names
 Singham (name), a surname or given name (including a list of people with the name)

See also